Saddiq Bey (born April 9, 1999) is an American professional basketball player for the Atlanta Hawks of the National Basketball Association (NBA). He played college basketball for the Villanova Wildcats.

High school career
Bey is the son of Drewana Bey, a former high school principal who played collegiate basketball at Charlotte. He attended DeMatha Catholic High School his freshman year before transferring to Sidwell Friends School. He played AAU ball with D.C. Premier. He stood 5'9 as a freshman before growing through high school. Bey averaged 14.5 points, 6.5 rebounds, 2 assists and 2 steals per game as a junior to lead Sidwell to a conference championship. He injured his ankle as a senior and missed several games. As a senior, Bey averaged 21 points and eight rebounds per game.

A four-star recruit, Bey was ranked the 83rd best player in his class by 247Sports.com. Bey originally committed to North Carolina State on November 2, 2017. However, he asked to be released from his letter of intent in May 2018, and was denied a waiver to play in the Atlantic Coast Conference. After visiting Wake Forest, Boston College, and Vanderbilt, he signed with Villanova on June 15. Villanova coach Jay Wright had recruited Bey earlier in high school but began targeting him after Omari Spellman left for the NBA and a scholarship became available.

College career
In his debut versus Morgan State, Bey finished with 16 points and four rebounds. In his first six games he averaged a little under 16 points per game. Bey had his first double-double with 16 points and 11 rebounds on January 30, 2019, against DePaul. Villanova won the Big East Tournament to become the first team with three straight tournament titles, with Bey contributing 16 points and 10 rebounds in the 74–72 championship against Seton Hall. As a freshman, Bey averaged 8.2 points and 5.1 rebounds per game, starting 29 of 36 games. He was named to the Big East All-Freshman Team.

Coming into his sophomore season, Bey was named to the Julius Erving Award watchlist. On December 4, Bey scored 27 points to lead Villanova to an 80–69 win over Penn. He had a career-high 33 points including eight three-pointers on January 11, 2020, to help the Wildcats to a 80–66 victory over Georgetown. Bey scored 18 points the following game in a 79–75 overtime win against DePaul. At the conclusion of the regular season, Bey was unanimously selected first-team All-Big East. Bey was named the winner of the Robert V. Geasey Trophy as the top player in the Philadelphia Big 5. Bey won the Julius Erving Award at the end of the season as the nation's top small forward. Bey was the third Villanova player to win the award in the previous six seasons, following Josh Hart in 2017 and Mikal Bridges in 2018. He averaged 16.1 points, 4.7 rebounds, and 2.4 assists per game as a sophomore.

Professional career

Detroit Pistons (2020–2023)
Bey was drafted 19th overall by the Brooklyn Nets in the 2020 NBA draft. The following day, November 19, 2020, the Detroit Pistons acquired the draft rights to Bey in a three-team trade. On December 1, the Pistons announced that they had signed Bey. On February 15, 2021, Bey was named Eastern Conference Player of the Week. Bey would finish 4th in Rookie of the Year voting with 3 third-place votes.

On January 1, 2022, Bey hit a game-winning three-pointer over two defenders in the final seconds of overtime to propel the Pistons to a 117–116 victory over the San Antonio Spurs. Two days later, Bey scored a then career-high 34 points, along with eight rebounds, leading the Pistons to an 115–106 upset road victory over the defending champion Milwaukee Bucks. On March 17, 2022, Bey scored a career high 51 points, along with nine rebounds, four assists, and three steals, in a 134–120 win against the Orlando Magic. On March 23, 2022, Bey set a Pistons record for the most three-pointers made in a season with 192, breaking Allan Houston's previous record of 191.

On January 4, 2023, Bey scored 17 points and made a buzzer-beating, game-winning three-pointer in a 122–119 win over the Golden State Warriors.

Atlanta Hawks (2023–present) 
On February 9, 2023, Bey was traded to the Atlanta Hawks in a four-team trade involving the Golden State Warriors and Portland Trail Blazers. He made his Hawks debut on February 13, recording 12 points and five rebounds in a 144–138 loss to the Charlotte Hornets.

Career statistics

Regular season 

|-
| style="text-align:left;"| 
| style="text-align:left;"| Detroit
| 70 || 53 || 27.3 || .404 || .380 || .844 || 4.5 || 1.4 || .7 || .2 || 12.2
|-
| style="text-align:left;"| 
| style="text-align:left;"| Detroit
| 82 || 82 || 33.0 || .396 || .346 || .827 || 5.4 || 2.8 || .9 || .2 || 16.1
|-
| style="text-align:left;"| 
| style="text-align:left;"| Detroit
| 52 || 30 || 28.8 || .404 || .345 || .861 || 4.7 || 1.6 || 1.0 || .2 || 14.8
|- class="sortbottom"
| style="text-align:center;" colspan="2"| Career
| 204 || 165 || 30.0 || .400 || .357 || .843 || 2.9 || 2.0 || .9 || .2 || 14.5

College

|-
| style="text-align:left;"| 2018–19
| style="text-align:left;"| Villanova
| 36 || 29 || 29.6 || .458 || .374 || .644 || 5.1 || 1.3 || .9 || .3 || 8.2
|-
| style="text-align:left;"| 2019–20
| style="text-align:left;"| Villanova
| 31 || 31 || 33.9 || .477 || .451 || .769 || 4.7 || 2.4 || .8 || .4 || 16.1
|- class="sortbottom"
| style="text-align:center;" colspan="2"| Career
| 67 || 60 || 31.6 || .469 || .418 || .728 || 4.9 || 1.8 || .8 || .4 || 11.9

References

External links
Villanova Wildcats bio

1999 births
Living people
21st-century African-American sportspeople
African-American basketball players
American men's basketball players
Atlanta Hawks players
Basketball players from Maryland
Brooklyn Nets draft picks
Detroit Pistons players
People from Largo, Maryland
Small forwards
Sportspeople from the Washington metropolitan area
Villanova Wildcats men's basketball players